The Buckler Cars company founded by C. D. F. Buckler was based at 67 Caversham Road, Reading, Berkshire, England and produced approximately 400 cars between 1947 and 1962. In about 1947, Buckler took over the Welco Farm Implements Ltd at Crowthorne, Berkshire and a plaque can be seen on the site of the former factory.

Background

Buckler Cars Limited
Bucklers were unusual in that they featured spaceframe construction. The cars were of high quality and supplied either fully built to order with a works body or optionally and mostly in component form for home completion. They were designed to accept a range of mechanical components to enable buyers to create a lightweight sports car suitable for road use and in rallies, trials, speed hillclimbs or racing. The first model, based on Derek Buckler's own very successful 1947 Buckler Special, was called the Mark V. Buckler allegedly did not want people to think it was the first car.

After success in the early and mid-1950s, Buckler's popularity waned during the later 1950s as other manufacturers came on the scene and when the kit-car market suffered a reversal in the early 1960s. However Buckler had considerable success entering the new go kart market in the 1960s, led by Jack Barlow. Due to ill health, Buckler sold his company in 1962. Once Buckler sold the company it seemed to lose momentum and the new owners, Mike Luff and Frank Fletcher, closed it down in 1965. Buckler, who had been in poor health for some time, died in 1964.

In addition to making cars, Buckler's made gear sets for other companies including Lotus Cars. They also built the first racing car chassis for the Brabham MRD.

Overseas
During the 1950s Buckler's were exported globally. In New Zealand Arthur Harris managed Buckler (NZ) Limited.  The first Mk90 registered to race in New Zealand in October 1956 was owned by Merv Mayo and powered by a Ford 100E engine.

Car models
It was the policy of the company that the specifications of all the cars was very flexible around a central design concept, as each car, kit or chassis was built to order. Basically there were about 12 model types over a period of almost 20 years.

See also
Ferris de Joux
Microplas
 List of car manufacturers of the United Kingdom

References

 A-Z of Cars 1945–1970. Michael Sedgewick and Mark Gillies. Bay View Books 1993.

External links
 Buckler Register

Defunct motor vehicle manufacturers of England
Kit car manufacturers
Companies based in Reading, Berkshire
Cars of New Zealand
Vehicle manufacturing companies established in 1947
1947 establishments in England
1965 disestablishments in England
British companies disestablished in 1965
British companies established in 1947